Alberto Angela (born 8 April 1962) is an Italian paleontologist, writer and journalist. Angela is a famous history and science communicator in Italy.

Biography 
Alberto Angela was born in Paris, where his father worked as correspondent for RAI.

He accompanied his father, Italian TV announcer Piero Angela, on his trips ever since he was a child, something that allowed him to learn many European languages and to acquire a cosmopolitan culture. After being a student in France, he enrolled in a course of Natural Sciences at the University "La Sapienza" of Rome, finally graduating with 110/110 and a prize for his thesis. He also studied at multiple American universities, where he took courses of specialisation from Harvard, Columbia and UCLA and further focused on palaeontology and paleoanthropology. Once out of university he started working in the research field participating in paleoanthropologic digs in various places in the world, among which Zaire, Ishango, Tanzania, Olduvai and Laetoli, Sultanate of the Oman, Mongolia, and the desert of the Gobi.

In 1988 he published an essay on the new techniques of interactivity in scientific museums, entitled Musei (e mostre) a misura d'uomo. Come comunicare attraverso gli oggetti. Together with his father he has written various books of scientific subjects: La straordinaria storia dell'uomo (1989), La straordinaria storia della vita sulla Terra (1992), Il Pianeta dei Dinosauri (1993), Dentro al Mediterraneo (1995), La straordinaria storia di una vita che nasce - 9 mesi nel ventre materno (1996), Squali (1997), Viaggio nel Cosmo (1998).

As a journalist, he has collaborated with various daily papers and periodicals, among which La Stampa, Airone, Epoca.

On television programs, he has conceived and written together with his father Il pianeta dei dinosauri, transmitted by Rai Uno in 1993; he is one of the authors of a series of TV program(s), including Superquark, Quark Speciale, and Viaggio nel cosmo for Raiuno. He is also author of the afternoon documentary container-program Passaggio a Nord Ovest, on the same channel. In 1998 he was a commentator in the field in the Italian version of the series of documentaries "Big Cat Diary" devoted to the great African feline, entirely realized in co-production between RAI and BBC and for this program, he stayed in the reserve of Masai Mara, in Kenya.
Together with his father,  Angela was the host of the program Ulisse, from 2001 on Rai Tre, for which he won the Premio Flaiano for television. In 2002 he was attacked and robbed by bandits while filming a TV program, in the desert of Niger.

He received the America Award of the Italy-USA Foundation in 2017.

In 2018, he received honorary Neapolitan citizenship.

He is a member of the Italian institute of Human Palaeontology (Rome), and of the Centro Studi e Ricerche Ligabue (Venice).

Works
Piero Angela, Alberto Angela, The extraordinary story of human origins, Prometheus Books, 1993, 
Piero Angela, Alberto Angela, The extraordinary story of life on earth, Prometheus Books, 1996, 
Piero Angela, Alberto Angela, Sharks!: predators of the sea, Photographs Alberto Luca Recchi, Courage Books, 1998
Alberto Angela, A Day in the Life of Ancient Rome, Translated by Gregory Conti, Europa Editions, Incorporated, 2009,  
Alberto Angela, The Reach of Rome, Translated by Gregory Conti, Rizzoli Ex Libris, 2013, New York,

References

External links 

Alberto Angela's blog 

"Alberto Angela racconta il suo "Ulisse"", RAI

1962 births
Living people
Scientists from Paris
Italian paleontologists
Italian television personalities
Italian science writers
People of Piedmontese descent
Sapienza University of Rome alumni